The John Watson House, now called The Historic Magnolia Manor, also known as Burwell House is a historic plantation house located at Warrenton, Warren County, North Carolina.

It was listed on the National Register of Historic Places in 1990.

History
The original Georgian / Federal style farm house was originally built about 1815. John Watson acquired the property in the 1830s. Warson hired Jacob W. Holt in 1859 to do the overbuild on the original house. He added the two-story, Greek Revival style main block. It is overlaid with ornate Italianate style detail at the roofline and on the full-width front porch.  In 1997 the Carver family acquired the property. In 2003 the Carver family turned the house into a bed & breakfast. In 2019, the Youakim family acquired the property and uses it as a wedding venue.

References

Houses on the National Register of Historic Places in North Carolina
Georgian architecture in North Carolina
Federal architecture in North Carolina
Italianate architecture in North Carolina
Greek Revival houses in North Carolina
Houses completed in 1855
Houses in Warren County, North Carolina
Plantation houses in North Carolina
Bed and breakfasts in North Carolina
National Register of Historic Places in Warren County, North Carolina